Alliance of International Doctors (AID, Uluslararası Doktorlar Derneği in Turkish) is an organization established by a group of volunteer doctors, pharmacists, dentists, and nurses in Istanbul in 2011. AID provides medical assistance to the people in the regions affected by disasters and poverty. The president of the organization is Dr. Mevlit Yurtseven.

Activities

Emergency medical relief 
AID delivers medicine and hygiene items and deploys medical teams to the regions affected by natural disasters, war and violence. AID medical teams provided primary health care to the 2015 earthquake victims in Nepal.  AID worked in the Philippines following Typhoon Haiyan as well as in the camps for internally displaced persons in Arakan, Myanmar, in 2013. AID sent a surgical team to Gaza during the attack in 2012. AID has been conducting health screenings, hygiene kit distribution and vaccinations for the Syrians affected by the Syrian Civil War. AID provided primary health care to the Syrian refugees from Kobane following the mass influx in September 2014.

Permanent and preventive health services 

AID provided primary health care to Somali refugees in Kenya's Dadaab Refugee Camp between August 2011 and July 2012. AID volunteers implemented mosquito net distribution projects in Kenya and Uganda for malaria prevention, and established a mother-and-child health center in Uganda. AID carried out circumcision projects in some of the Balkan countries, Tunisia, and Bangladesh for orphans and underprivileged children.

AID collaborates with IHH, the Islamic Development Bank, Turkish International Cooperation and Development Agency, and Niger Ministry of Health for a cataract project in Niamey, Niger. An ophthalmology department has been established  at Lamorde Hospital of Abdou Moumouni University for the project, which targets to perform 30,000 free-of-charge cataract surgeries in five years and to transfer skills to the local personnel. AID is responsible for the human resources and for providing and maintaining the medical equipment and consumables. AID will collaborate with other organizations working on prevention of blindness during the project. The department will be handed over to the Niger authorities in 2019.

Health Education 
AID is providing health education services in coordination with local organizations in different regions.

Psychological Rehabilitation 

AID conducts psychological support programs to help the victims of natural disasters and wars as well as orphans and their families cope with the trauma and the loss they had experienced, and to reduce the negative impacts of these experiences on them. AID is providing psychosocial support to Syrian refugee women and children in Istanbul including psychotherapy since 2014.

References

External links 

  

Health charities
Refugee aid organizations
Refugee aid organizations in Europe
Vaccination-related organizations
Medical and health organizations based in Turkey